Patrick Francis "Charlie" O'Leary (23 March 1911 – 22 December 1998) was an Australian rules footballer who played with Footscray and Fitzroy in the Victorian Football League (VFL).

O'Leary later served in the Australian Army during World War II.

Notes

External links 

1911 births
1998 deaths
Australian rules footballers from Victoria (Australia)
Western Bulldogs players
Fitzroy Football Club players
Maffra Football Club players